Amenirdis I (throne name: Hatneferumut) was a God's Wife of Amun during the 25th Dynasty of ancient Egypt. Originating from the Kingdom of Kush, she was the daughter of Pharaoh Kashta and Queen Pebatjma, and was later adopted by Shepenupet I. She went on to rule as high priestess, and has been shown in several artifacts from the period.

Biography
She was a Kushite princess, the daughter of Pharaoh Kashta and Queen Pebatjma. She is likely to have been the sister of pharaohs Shabaka and Piye. Kashta arranged to have Amenirdis I adopted by the Divine Adoratrice of Amun, Shepenupet I, at Thebes as her successor. This shows that Kashta already controlled Upper Egypt prior to the reign of Piye, his successor.

She ruled as high priestess approximately between 714 and 700 BCE, under the reigns of Shabaka and Shabataka, and she adopted Piye's daughter Shepenupet II as her successor. She also held the priestly titles of Divine Adoratrice of Amun and God's Hand. Upon her death, she was buried in a tomb in the grounds of Medinet Habu.

She is depicted in the Osiris-Hekadjet ("Osiris, Ruler of Eternity") temple in the Karnak temple complex, and in Wadi Gasus, along with Shepenupet I. She is mentioned on two offering tables, five statues, a stela and several small objects including scarabs. A statue of Amenirdis I carved from granitoid and decorated in gold leaf is held by the Nubian Museum in Aswan, Upper Egypt. The statue itself shows her decorated in the Egyptian style, with similarities to depictions of Isis and Hathor.

References

Further reading

 
 
Ayad, Mariam F. God's Wife, God's Servant: The God's Wife of Amun (c. 740–525 BC). Routledge, 2009. .
 
 
Kitchen, Kenneth, The Third Intermediate Period in Egypt (1100–650 B.C.), 2 Sub edition. Aris & Phillips, 1996. .

External links

God's Wives of Amun
Princesses of the Twenty-fifth Dynasty of Egypt
8th-century BC clergy
8th-century BC Egyptian women
8th-century BC Egyptian people